Khema Baba Temple is a Hindu temple dedicated to folk deity, Lord Khema Baba  located near a sand dune, in Baytu, Barmer District of Rajasthan at Latitude 25.89201°N and Longitude 71.77074°E. It is  from Barmer District.  It is situated at a distance of 800m from Railway station and Govt bus stand Baytu. 

Khema Baba was a social reformer born in village Baytu Bhopji in Baytu. He was a revered person in Rajasthan as well as in Gujarat. This temple in Baytu headquarter to commemorate him. Fairs are organized every year on magha sudi 9 and bhadrapada sudi 9, in which thousands of people take part from different Region of marwar and around.

Renovation
Beginning in October 2020, renovations to the temple are underway, and as of December 2022, work is still being done. The Samadhi Sthal of Khema Baba is the foundation for the temple.

References

External links

Khema Baba Temple Baytu

Hindu temples in Rajasthan
Tourist attractions in Barmer district
Temples in Rajasthan
Barmer district